The 2004 Richmond Spiders football team represented the University of Richmond during the 2004 NCAA Division I-AA football season. Richmond competed as a member of the Atlantic 10 Conference (A-10), and played their home games at the University of Richmond Stadium.

The Spiders were led by first-year head coach Dave Clawson, who was previously head coach at Fordham University. Richmond finished the regular season with a 3–8 overall record and 2–6 record in conference play.

Schedule

Coaching staff

References

Richmond
Richmond Spiders football seasons
Richmond Spiders football